Ivan Dmytrovych Mamrosenko (born 27 March 2000) is a Ukrainian professional footballer who plays as a centre-back for Ukrainian club Mariupol.

References

External links
 
 

2000 births
Living people
Footballers from Zaporizhzhia
Ukrainian footballers
Association football defenders
Piddubny Olympic College alumni
FC Chornomorets Odesa players
FC Vorskla Poltava players
FC Tavria-Skif Rozdol players
FC Mariupol players
FC Yarud Mariupol players
Ukrainian Premier League players
Ukrainian First League players
Ukrainian Second League players